René y René was a Latin pop duo from Laredo, Texas. Composed of René Ornelas (born August 26, 1936) and René Herrera (born October 2, 1935; died December 20, 2005), the group scored two hit singles in the U.S. in the 1960s. 1964's "Angelito" ("Little Angel") peaked at #43 on the U.S. Billboard Hot 100 chart, and 1969's "Lo Mucho que Te Quiero (The More I Love You)" hit #2 on the Adult Contemporary chart, #14 on the Hot 100 chart, and #15 in Canada.

René y René were among the first Chicano artists to appear on American Bandstand (August 8, 1964). They were inducted into the Tejano Music Hall of Fame in 1990 and the Tejano ROOTS Hall of Fame in 2001.

René Ornelas was still performing (under the name "René René") as of 2010.

Selected discography
Singles:
 Angelito / Write Me Soon	1964
 Little Vagabond / Little Peanuts 1964
 Yo Te Lo Dije (I Could Have Told You) / Pretty Flower Fade Away 1964
 Please Don't Bother / Undecided 1964
 Chantilly Lace / I'm Not The Only One (No Soy El Unico) 1965
 Loving You Could Hurt Me So / Little Diamonds 1965
 Lo Mucho Que Te Quiero (The More I Love You) / Mornin' 1968
 Las Cosas / You Will Cry 1969
 Enchilada Jose / Lloraras 1969
 Love Is For The Two Of Us / Sally Tosis 1969
 My Amigo Jose / Good Ole Days 1970

See also
List of 1960s one-hit wonders in the United States

References

External links
 
 
 https://www.youtube.com/watch?v=bXDb5ktGQ_8 "Angelito" - Performance on American Bandstand
 https://www.youtube.com/watch?v=yX1d_dWxoro "Este Amor de los Dos" - Performance on the Val De La O Show
 https://www.youtube.com/watch?v=sHDesR_GlTg "Tequila" - Music Video

Musical groups from Texas
1936 births
Living people
American musical duos
Tejano musicians
White Whale Records artists